John Gyapong may refer to:
 John Owusu Gyapong, Ghanaian professor of epidemiology
 John Kwadwo Gyapong, Ghanaian politician and executive director